Daniel James Hall (born 30 June 1978) is an Australian musician from Melbourne who has been in two rock bands, Taxiride and Airway Lanes. With Taxiride, as guitarist, pianist and vocalist, he had a top 10 hit on the Australian Recording Industry Association (ARIA) Singles Chart with "Get Set" and a No. 1 album with Imaginate in 1999 on the related Albums Chart. He left Taxiride in 2001 to begin a solo career. He provided vocals for "Don't Look Back" which was used on TV soap opera, Neighbours. He later formed Airway Lanes in late 2004. They released their debut album, In Vino Veritas in May 2008 with its lead single, "Don't Let Go", chosen as iTunes' 'Single of the Week'.

Taxiride
From 1994, Daniel Hall performed as a busker in the local streets of Camberwell and at live venues in Melbourne for three years. In 1997, Tim Wild recruited Hall to meet his friends, Jason Singh and Tim Watson. By 1998, the unnamed group recorded a demo cassette which was given to a taxi driver friend who played it to his passengers. The band asked how it was received whilst on the taxi ride—which inspired the group's name, Taxiride.

Soon after, Taxiride signed a joint deal with Warner Music Group in Australia and Sire Records in the US, where they relocated to Ocean Way Recording studios in Los Angeles to work with producer Jack Joseph Puig. Their debut album Imaginate hit No. 1 on the ARIA Albums Chart and went double platinum. It spawned the top 10 hit "Get Set", which won the Breakthrough Artist – Single ARIA Award for 1999. To support the global release of their debut album, the band toured Australia, America, Japan and Europe through 1999 and 2000.

In 2001 Hall decided to leave Taxiride after the first album to pursue his solo career and refine his song writing. Hall said he was unhappy with "the pop direction the band was taking".

Hall collaborated with his former Taxiride band mates to co-write a track for their third album, Axiomatic. Prior to Taxiride's release of their live acoustic album, Electrophobia, in September 2006, Hall reconnected with its band members to co-write more songs.

Airway Lanes
After leaving Taxiride in 2001, Hall started his solo career. He provided vocals for "Don't Look Back" which was used on TV soap opera, Neighbours.

Hall's second band, Airway Lanes was formed with fellow songwriter-guitarist Chris Hawker initially as an acoustic duo in late 2004. Their first live appearances as an electric band were a series of Sunday shows in early 2005 at the Duke of Windsor Hotel, with new members Paul 'Spyder' Marret, playing drums and backup vocals, and Glen 'Scrubby' Evans, on bass guitar.

In November, the band signed with record label Dust Devil Music through Stomp. They recorded their self-titled debut extended play, Airway Lanes, in Sing Sing studios in Melbourne with producer and engineer Jimi Maroudas (Pete Murray and The Living End). It was released on 3 April 2006. Rock journalist, Jeff Jenkins, was impressed with Hall's talent and the "quality pop-rock; catchy songs, with depth" displayed by the EP. A full length album, In Vino Veritas followed on 3 May 2008; its lead single, "Don't Let Go", was chosen as iTunes' 'Single of the Week', when it exceeded 11,000 downloads.

In September 2008, Hall returned to Taxiride with Singh and Wild, they toured the Australian east coast sharing some performances with Noiseworks into October and November.

References

1978 births
Living people
Australian male singers
Australian guitarists
Musicians from Melbourne
Taxiride members
Australian male guitarists